Potassium voltage-gated channel, Shaw-related subfamily, member 4 (KCNC4), also known as Kv3.4, is a human gene.

The Shaker gene family of Drosophila encodes components of voltage-gated potassium channels and comprises four subfamilies. Based on sequence similarity, this gene is similar to the Shaw subfamily. The protein encoded by this gene belongs to the delayed rectifier class of channel proteins and is an integral membrane protein that mediates the voltage-dependent potassium ion permeability of excitable membranes. It generates atypical voltage-dependent transient current that may be important for neuronal excitability. Several transcript variants encoding different isoforms have been found for this gene.

See also
 Voltage-gated potassium channel

References

Further reading

Ion channels